The women's rhythmic individual all-around competition at the 2014 Asian Games in Incheon, South Korea was held on 1 and 2 October 2014 at the Namdong Gymnasium.

Schedule
All times are Korea Standard Time (UTC+09:00)

Results

Qualification

Final

References

Results

External links
Official website

Rhythmic Women Individual